Satish Pradhan (b 29 August 1940 Dhar M.P.) is a former mayor of Thane city of India. He was the member of Rajya Sabha from Maharashtra for the two terms of 5 July 1992 to 4 July 1998 and  5 July 1998 till 4 July 2004. He belongs to Shiv Sena and was Leader of Shiv Sena Party in Rajya Sabha.

References

Mayors of Thane
Shiv Sena politicians
Rajya Sabha members from Maharashtra
People from Dhar
1940 births
Living people
Marathi politicians